Chaoborus albatus is a species of phantom midges in the family Chaoboridae.

References

Chaoboridae
Articles created by Qbugbot
Insects described in 1921